Briouze is a commune in the Orne department of Normandy in northwestern France. It is considered the capital of the pays d'Houlme at the western end of the Orne in the Norman bocage. The nearby Grand Hazé marshland is a heritage-listed area (Natura 2000).

William de Braose, First Lord of Bramber (Guillaume de Briouze) was granted lands in England after the Norman conquest and used his wealth to build a priory in his home town.

The name Briouze probably comes from an older Norman form of the word "boue", or "mud".

Population

Heraldry

Transport
Briouze station has rail connections to Argentan, Paris and Granville.

See also
 Communes of the Orne department

References

Communes of Orne